The INKA CC300, also known in the Philippines as the PNR 9000 Class, is a multipurpose Diesel-hydraulic locomotive owned by  and built by Indonesian state-owned rolling stock manufacturer PT INKA. Launched in 2013, it is the first railway locomotive wholly produced by Indonesia and the first locomotive exported by Indonesia to another country, when the Philippine National Railways (PNR) received its first set of INKA CC300 locomotives in December 2020.

History
For decades, Kereta Api Indonesia (KAI), Indonesia's state-owned railway company, has operated trains throughout the country using diesel and electric locomotives supplied by other countries. However, most of these locomotives were designed without consideration of Indonesia's tropical climate, and as such, these locomotives are vulnerable to flooding during the monsoon season. In 2009, KAI and Ministry of Transportation began cooperation for the development of a new locomotive that would be built in Indonesia and designed to withstand flooding on railway tracks.

State-owned rolling stock manufacturer PT INKA was chosen as the manufacturer of the locomotives. The company spent around 20 billion rupiahs for each locomotive, with the Indonesian government contributing 30 billion rupiahs for the development cost. Three units of these locomotives were built in PT INKA's locomotive plant in Madiun, East Java, Indonesia. The locomotives were launched and unveiled to the public on 20 May 2013, coinciding with the National Awakening Day commemorations.

Technical specifications
It features double cabins that allow train drivers to switch from the front to the rear cabin without climbing down the train. The braking system used on the locomotive is a pneumatic brake manufactured by Westinghouse Air Brake Technologies (Wabtec), while the master controller was supplied by Woojin Industrial Systems from South Korea. It is also equipped with a Caterpillar CAT C15 generator set so that it does not require a generating train if it pulls a series of passenger trains. The locomotive is also equipped with CCTV cameras on both sides for easier maneuvering when reversing and to monitor coaches being pulled.

Allocations
There are currently five units of INKA CC300 locomotives (CC 300 12 01, CC 300 12 02, CC 300 12 03, CC 300 14 01, CC 300 14 02) made by PT INKA in Indonesia and three units (CC 300 20 01, CC 300 20 02, CC 300 20 03) in the Philippines. The locomotives in Indonesia were placed in Jakarta (Tanah Abang Depot & Cipinang Depot), East Java (Madiun PT INKA Depot), North Sumatra (Medan Depot) & Lampung (Tanjung Karang Depot), while the locomotives in the Philippines were placed at the Tutuban Depot.

PNR 9000 class

Purchase

During its launch, Purnomo said that PT INKA is looking forward to export the locomotive to other countries in need of flood-resistant locomotives. On 28 May 2018, the company signed a contract worth ₱1.4 billion (US$26 million) to supply the Philippine National Railways with three brand-new INKA CC300 locomotives and 15 coaches for use in re-fleeting its commuter service in Metro Manila. The locomotives were built in PT INKA's Madiun plant and underwent testing in KAI's railway lines before it was delivered to the Philippines on 23 December 2020. This export follows PT INKA's previous export to the PNR of two sets of 8000 class Diesel Multiple Units in December 2019 worth 130 billion rupiah (US$9.7 million) and four sets of 8100 class Diesel Multiple Units in February 2020 worth 301 billion rupiah (US$21.4 million).

Design

Unlike the first CC300s of Indonesia (CC 300 12 01 - CC 300 12 03), but same design as the other 2 Indonesian CC300s (CC 300 14 01 & CC 300 14 02), the locomotives have four windshields instead of two. The locomotives feature the Philippine National Railways logo at the side of the cab doors and in the front cabs, and the Department of Transportation located in the middle. The locomotives are painted orange.

Operations

On 28 January 2021, the 9000 class locomotives and the 8300 class coaches were inaugurated at Dela Rosa Station. The inauguration was performed by DHL 9002 and 8303. The locomotives currently hauls the 8300 coaches and serves the PNR Metro South Commuter.

On 13 July 2021, the INKA CC300 locomotive reached Laguna for the first time. It was performed by DHL 9003 and 8302.

On February 13, 2022, DHL 9003 and 8302 went to San Pablo for the opening of the San Pablo - Lucena inter-provincial commuter. However, the train returned to Manila on February 15.

On April 07, 2022, An INKA CC300 and 8300 class coach was used as a sleeper train to Calamba for the first time. It was performed by DHL 9003 and passenger set 8301.

On June 25, 2022, DHL 9001 and 9003 along with INKA 8300 class set 8302 and 8303 are used on the Inauguration of the Inter-Provincial Commuter line. DHL 9003 and 8302 went home to Tutuban to serve the MSC line a day later, although on early October, the aforementioned unit returned to Lucena after the train service was extended to Calamba on October 6.

References

External links
 
  
  

3 ft 6 in gauge locomotives of Indonesia
 Diesel-hydraulic locomotives of Indonesia
 Philippine National Railways
 Rolling stock of the Philippines
 Co′Co′ locomotives